The Money Pit is a 1986 American comedy film directed by Richard Benjamin and starring Tom Hanks and Shelley Long as a couple who attempt to renovate a recently purchased house. The film is a remake of the 1948 Cary Grant comedy film Mr. Blandings Builds His Dream House, and was filmed in New York City and Lattingtown, New York, and was co-executive produced by Steven Spielberg. A remake, Drömkåken, directed by Peter Dalle, was released to cinemas in Sweden on 28 October 1993.

Plot
Attorney Walter Fielding and his classical musician girlfriend, Anna Crowley, learn of Walter Sr.'s wedding to a woman named Florinda shortly after fleeing the country for embezzling millions of dollars from their musician clients. The next morning, they are told they need to vacate the apartment they are subletting from Anna's ex-husband, Max Beissart, a self-absorbed conductor who has returned early from Europe.

Through an unscrupulous realtor friend, Walter learns about a million-dollar distress sale mansion on the market for a mere $200,000. He and Anna meet the owner, Estelle, who claims she must sell it quickly because her husband, Carlos, has been arrested. Her sob story and insistence at keeping the place in candlelight in order to save money "for the bloodsucking lawyers", distracts Walter and enchants Anna, who finds it romantic. They decide to buy it.

From the moment Walter and Anna take possession of the house, it quickly begins to fall apart. Among other problems, the entire front door frame rips out of the wall, the main staircase collapses, the plumbing is full of gunk, the electrical system catches fire, the bathtub crashes through the floor, the chimney collapses, and a raccoon is living in the dumbwaiter.

Contractors Art and Brad Shirk summarily tear the house to pieces using Walter's $5,000 down payment, leaving him and Anna embroiled in bureaucracy to secure the necessary building permits to complete the work. His continuing frustration at the escalating costs of restoring the house leads him to brand it a "money pit", whilst the Shirks continue to assure him that their work will take "two weeks".
 
The repair work continues for a grueling four months and Walter and Anna realize they need more money to complete the renovations. She attempts to secure additional funds from Max by selling him some artwork she received in their divorce. Although he does not care for it, he agrees to its purchase. He wines and dines her, and the next morning, when she wakes up in his bed, he allows her to believe that she has cheated on Walter; in reality, Max slept on the couch. Walter later asks her point-blank if she slept with Max, but she hastily denies it. His suspicions push her to admit that she did so, but the damage is done.

Due to Walter and Anna's stubbornness, their relationship becomes more and more hostile and in a rare moment of agreement, they vow to sell the house once it is restored and split the proceeds. This nearly happens, but he misses her and says he loves her even if she did sleep with Max. She happily tells him that she didn't and they reconcile. In the end, they are married in front of the newly repaired house.

Ultimately, Estelle and her husband/partner-in-crime, Carlos, resurface in Brazil where they try to persuade Walter's father and his new bride to purchase an old house they claim to have lived in for several years, implying that the vicious circle is about to start all over again.

Cast

Production
Exterior shots used a relatively rundown house in Lattingtown, Long Island that had been built in 1898 in the Colonial style. After the film, it was purchased for $2.1 million in 2002. In November 2019, the Seattle PI reported that the Long Island house had "finally" sold for around $3.5 million, at a significant loss in relation to renovation costs. Kathleen Turner was originally offered the role of Anna Crowley but she declined to star in The Jewel of the Nile, although she found the script subpar.

Reception
On Rotten Tomatoes, the film has an approval rating of 50% based on 22 reviews, with an average rating of 4.9/10. On Metacritic it has a score of 49 out of 100, based on reviews from 14 critics, indicating "mixed or average reviews". Audiences surveyed by CinemaScore gave the film an average grade "C+" on scale of A+ to F.

Roger Ebert gave The Money Pit only one out of four stars, calling the film "one monotonous sight gag after another."

The film is a remake of the 1948 Cary Grant comedy Mr. Blandings Builds His Dream House, a fact that was pointed out by multiple critics.

Home media 
The film was released on DVD by Universal Pictures Home Entertainment in 2003, and later re-released in 2011 as part of a three-film set, the Tom Hanks Comedy Favorites Collection, along with The 'Burbs and Dragnet.

The film was released on Blu-ray on August 16, 2016.

Television adaptation 
In 2013, NBC announced they were developing a TV series based on the film, but the project was later put on hold.

References

External links

 
 
 
 

1986 films
1986 comedy films
Amblin Entertainment films
American comedy films
Remakes of American films
1980s English-language films
Films about classical music and musicians
Films about lawyers
Films directed by Richard Benjamin
Films produced by Kathleen Kennedy
Films produced by Frank Marshall
Films scored by Michel Colombier
Films set in country houses
Films set in Long Island
Films set in New York City
Films shot in New York (state)
Films shot in New York City
Universal Pictures films
1980s American films